MF Lubenice was a ferry owned by Croatian shipping company Jadrolinija that operated on local routes. Built in Japan in 1983. Sold for scrap in 2022.

References

Passenger ships
Ferries of Croatia
1982 ships